The following is a list of arched structures known in architecture as vaults.

 Annular vault – A Barrel vault springing from two concentric walls.
 Aynalı vault – Turkish vault made by cutting a monastery vault's upper part in a horizontal plane. See Cavetto vault
 Barrel vault – An architecture tunnel vault or barrel vault is a semicircular arch extended in depth: a continuous series of arches, one behind the other. The simplest form of an architecture vault, consisting of a continuous surface of semicircular or pointed sections. It resembles a barrel or tunnel which has been cut in half lengthwise and is known as tunnel vault or wagon vault. A longitudinal barrel vault is a barrel (or tunnel) vault which follows the main longitudinal direction of the nave. Usually when a vault is referred to simply as a barrel (or tunnel) vault, it may be assumed to be a longitudinal barrel vault.
 Baroque vault – term from Church of Our Lady in front of Týn. Also see Baroque architecture.
 Catalan vault – The Catalan vault, also called the Catalan turn or Catalan arch, is a type of low arch made of plain bricks. It is traditionally constructed by laying bricks lengthwise, making it a much gentler curve than has generally been produced by other methods of construction.
 Cavetto vault – Cavetto is a hollow, concave molding sometimes employed in the place of the cymatium of a cornice, as in that of the Doric order of the theatre of Marcellus. It forms the crowning feature of Egyptian temples, and took the place of the cymatium in many of the Etruscan temples.  
 Catenary arch - A vault may take the shape of an inverted catenary.
 Cloister vault – A dome-like vault having a square or polygonal base from which curved segments rise to a central point.
 Corbel vault – A concave formation of blocks, usually stone or masonry; the vault is formed by blocks as they project inward from the layer on which they rest.
 Cross vault – See Groin vault
 Cycloidal vault – A vault in which the diameter across the springline is equal to the circumference of a circle fitting inside the space between the apex of the vault and the diameter line. This particular proportion system creates very little lateral thrust from the vault structure.
 Cylindrical vault – See Barrel vault
 Diamond vault – A diamond vault is a form of vault used in the Late Gothic and Renaissance style, which is based on an elaborate system of cavernous vaults in a manner resembling diamonds. It was widely used especially in Central European countries.
 Domical vault – See Cloister vault
 Fan vault – An architecture vault which consists of fan-shaped half cones which usually meet at the center of a vault.
 Gothic vault – From Talk page. See also Gothic architecture and Church of Holy Trinity in Mošovce, Synagogue of Tomar.
 Groin vault – An architecture groin vault is formed when two barrel vaults intersect. The undersurface, or soffit, may be generated from a series of pointed, rather than round, arches. Also known as a cross vault. An architecture vault produced by the intersection at right angles of two barrel (tunnel) vaults. Sometimes the arches of groin vaults may be pointed instead of round.
 Handkerchief vault – See Dome
 Inflatable vault 
 Lierne – A Lierne (from the French lier – to bind) in Gothic rib-vaulting is an architectural term for a tertiary rib spanning between two other ribs, instead of from a springer, or to the central boss. It is named after the star shape generated by connecting liernes. Also see Stellar vault.
 Muqarnas vault – Muqarnas is the Arabic word for stalactite vault, an architectural ornament developed around the middle of the tenth century in north-eastern Iran and almost simultaneously, but apparently independently, in central North Africa. A muqarnas is a three-dimensional architectural decoration composed of niche-like elements arranged in tiers. The two-dimensional projection of a muqarnas vault consists of a small variety of simple geometrical elements.
 Net vault – A vault on which a complex of ribs gives a net-like appearance.
 Nubian vault – A contour that obtained when a chain is held up at its two ends.
 Ogee vault – Ogee is a shape consisting of a concave arc flowing into a convex arc, so forming an S-shaped curve with vertical ends.
 Ogival vault – An architectural vault
 Parabolic vault – An architectural vault with a parabolic cross section.
 Hyperbolic paraboloid vault.
 Ploughshare vault – A Rib vault where the wall ribs spring from a higher position than those of the diagonal ribs.
 Quadripartite vault – A Rib vault where the bay is divided by diagonal and transverse ribs into four cells or webs.
 Rampant vault – A Barrel vault where one springing in point is higher than the opposite springing point.
 Rear vault – A  of the internal hood of a doorway or window to which a splay has been given on the reveal, sometimes the vaulting surface is terminated by a small rib known as the scoinson rib, and a further development is given by angle shafts carrying this rib, known as scoinson shafts.
 Rib vault – A rib vault is any vault reinforced by masonry ribs. Also known as a ribbed vault. A rib vault may be a quadripartite rib vault (which is divided into four sections by two diagonal ribs) and a sexpartite rib vault (a rib vault whose surface is divided into six sections by three ribs).
 Sail vault – See Dome
 Sexpartite vault – A Rib vault similar to the Quadripartite vault, but where the bay is further divided by an extra transverse ribs so that there are six cells.
 Shell vault – A thin self-supporting vault.
 Stalactite vault – See Muqarnas vault. A vaulting system employing carved Muqarna to corbel the span.
 Stellar vault – from Lierne (vault). A Rib vault including liernes and tiercerons forming a star shaped pattern of ribs.
 Stilted vault – See Ploughshare vault
 Surbased vault – A vault with a cross section less than a semicircle, i.e. a segment.
 Surmounted vault – A vault with a cross section greater than a semicircle.
 Timbrel vault – from Guastavino tile. U.S.-patented (1885) system using interlocking terracotta tiles and layers of mortar in a thin skin, with the tiles following the curve of the roof as opposed to horizontal (corbelling), or perpendicular to the curve (Roman). This is known as timbrel vaulting because of supposed likeness to the skin of a timbrel or tambourine.
 Tierceron vault – A vault consisting of unnecessary ribs all transverse in nature, often confused with a Fan vault from a conceived imagery standpoint, often intersecting a ridge rib.
 Tripartite vault – The resulting intersection, triangular on plan, of 3 vaults.
 Tunnel vault – See Barrel vault
 Vault grid
 Wagon vault – See Barrel vault

References

Vaults